Sri Ramakrishna Engineering College (SREC) is an autonomous Engineering college in India founded by Sevaratna Dr. R. Venkatesalu. It is affiliated with the Anna University in Chennai, and approved by the All India Council for Technical Education (AICTE) of New Delhi.  It is accredited by the NBA (National Board of Accreditation) for most of its courses and by the Government of Tamil Nadu.

History
The college was founded in the year 1994 by Philanthropist and Industrialist Sevaratna Dr. R. Venkatesalu. It provides various undergraduate and postgraduate courses in engineering and other technical streams. The college attained its autonomous status in 2007-2008 when Anna University was split into six different universities. SREC is one of many institutions managed by SNR Sons Charitable Trust, founded by Sevaratna Dr. R. Venkatesalu. The college covers a total area of 45 acres.

Academics

Undergraduate Courses
 B.E. Aeronautical Engineering
 B.E. Biomedical Engineering.
 B.E. Civil Engineering
 B.E. Computer Science Engineering
 B.E. Electrical and Electronics Engineering
 B.E. Electronics and Communication Engineering
 B.E. Electronics and Instrumentation Engineering
 B.E. Mechanical Engineering
 B.E. Robotics and Automation
 B.Tech. Artificial Intelligence and Data Science
 B.Tech. Information Technology

Postgraduate courses
 M.E. Power Electronics and Drives
 M.E. Computer Science and Engineering
 M.E. Manufacturing Engineering
 M.E. Embedded Systems Technologies
 M.E. VLSI
 M.E. Nanoscience and Technology
 M.E. Control and Instrumentation Engineering
 Master of Business Administration.

Research Programmes (Bharathiar University)
 M.Phil. (Computer Science)
 Ph.D. (Computer Science  Engineering programming).

Admission procedure

For undergraduate programmes - first year of study

 Admissions are based on Single Window System
 Students ranked based on performance in +2 exam
 Admission for Management seats 35%

For undergraduate programmes - second year of study (Lateral entry)

 Strength – 10% of sanctioned seats in undergraduate programs
 As per DOTE/Anna University norms.

For MCA & MBA programmes

 Single Window admission
 Students ranked based on performance in qualifying Degree and TANCET as per Tamil Nadu government regulations
Reservation policy as per Tamil Nadu Government Rules.

Rankings

The National Institutional Ranking Framework (NIRF) ranked it 142 among Engineering colleges in 2020.

Location
It is located in Coimbatore, Tamil Nadu, India.

Student Associations
 Mechanical Engineering (MEQUEST)
 Electrical & Electronics Engineering Association
  Association of Electronics and Communication Engineering(ASELCOME)
 Association of Computer Science Engineering(ACE)
  Information Technology Engineer's Association(INTERACT)
 Association  of  Electronics and Instrumentation Engineering(AEINSTENS)
 Association of Biomedical Engineering
 Aeronautical Engineer's Association(AEA)
 Aeromodelling Club
 MCA(Merito CrAts)
 MBA(ZESTOR)
 Science & Humanities Association
 SREC Alumni Association
 Computer Society of India(CSI)

Non Technical
 Entrepreneurship Development Cell (EDC)
 English Literary Society (ELS)
 Tamil Mandram
 Fine Arts Club (FAC)
 Quiz club(Q'Zenith)
 Philately and Numismatics Club
 Red Ribbon Club
 Sports
 Nature Club

Library
The total area of the Library is 35172 Sq. ft (3269 sq. m) with a seating capacity of 100 General Reference: 40 Journals Section.

Total No.of Titles: 17273

Total no.of Volumes: 52221

Digital Library

Language Laboratory

Students can extensively use the Department of English and its Laboratory for learning Basic Interactive Communication skill practices, Vocabulary, Grammar, Pronunciation, Sentence Formation practices and TOEFL, GRE, GMAT and allied course practices. And also the department of English has numbers of Ph.D. holding lectures to guide the students.

Transport and Food Court
The College has 32 buses for commutation. The buses ply to several destinations located at the outskirts of the Coimbatore City.

Medical Facilities
A Health Centre is functioning on the campus to offer medical care. In case of emergency, a student will be taken to Sri Ramakrishna Hospital for treatment through 24hr ambulance facility in the campus.

Hostels
Now Four hostel blocks are available; Three blocks for men and One hostel block for women to accommodate and has a total Strength of 1,900 students.

Placements
SREC Placement and Training Cell opens the campus recruitment season for all undergraduate and postgraduate students at the start of their final year at the institution. Multinational and national companies are typically invited by the Placement Officer (PO) and the departmental Placement Representatives (PRs), and mutually convenient dates are scheduled for the recruitment process.

Sports
SREC hosts Soccer, Hockey, Cricket, Handball and athletics fields, Tennis courts, Volleyball courts, Basketball courts, and ball Badminton.

References

External links

 

Engineering colleges in Coimbatore
Educational institutions established in 1994
1994 establishments in Tamil Nadu